Peter Royston (born 1952 in London) is an English dancer, choreographer, teacher and director. He was a successful dancer, but his success increased after he began choreographing new works.

Early life
Royston started dance classes at age 5. He is a Royal Academy of Dancing scholar (1963–1968) and trained at The Royal Ballet School (1968–1970)
Arts Educational (1970–1971)

Career 
He danced in the Royal Ballet of Flanders, Munster State Ballet, Kiel State Ballet, and the Scottish Ballet (1975–1985).

He choreographed major works for The Scottish Ballet: Steps to ? (1981), To The Last Whale (1982), Randombach, Quarrels not their own (1983), Pococurantis (1985), Ringed by the flat horizon (1985). For Scottish Dance Theatre: Friction and Touch (both with Graham Bowers, 1985), Brief Encounter (1986), Love minus zero no limit (1986), 5 Women (1986) and Consuming Passions (1987)

Other choreography: Red Hot Shoes for Tron Theatre (writer Liz Lochhead 1987), Columba (opera to celebrate the 250th anniversary of Glasgow Cathedral 1987), Great Scot (director John Cairney 1988).

His successful career as a ballet dancer led to a choreographic career initiated by Scottish Ballet Director Peter Darrell, who chose Royston's workshop piece Steps to ..? for the company repertoire. This was followed by several commissions by Scottish Ballet. He created Scottish Dance Theatre in 1985 (not to be confused with the current Scottish Dance Theatre based in Dundee). This company was supported by The Scottish Arts Council. They toured Scotland and appeared in London (1985–1988). Initial performances explored a close collaboration with Designer Graham Bowers that had started with Pococurantis (Scottish Ballet) and developed with Friction and Touch (Scottish Dance Theatre). It was performed at the inaugural performances of SDT at The Tron Theatre in Glasgow and following tour to favourable reviews.

He represented the UK at The International Course for Choreographers and composers 1984 Directed by Robert Cohan. He served on the dance committee at The Scottish Arts Council 1994 - 1999. He was appointed lecturer at Dundee College in 1991. He developed a foundation course into the now Scottish school of contemporary dance based at The Space a £5million lottery funded studio and theatre complex which is home to the school.

He was appointed Dance Artist in Residence to Borders Region (1988–1991); he cCreated Borders Dance Festival and many works including a site specific work with composer Savourna Stevenson.

He was appointed dance lecturer at Dundee College 1991. He was Director of the Scottish School of Contemporary Dance (2000–2011). He was appointed as Dance development officer for Perth and Kinross Council in August 2012

References

People educated at the Royal Ballet School
English choreographers
Ballet choreographers
Ballet in Scotland
Living people
Dancers from London
1952 births